Marissa Brandt (born December 18, 1992), also known by her birth name Park Yoon-jung (also stylized as Park Yoon Jung or Park Yoonjung), is a Korean-American ice hockey player who plays with the South Korean national team. When competing internationally with the South Korean or Unified Korean national teams, she uses her birth name.

Playing career 

Brandt played college ice hockey with the Golden Gusties ice hockey program at Gustavus Adolphus College in the Minnesota Intercollegiate Athletic Conference (MIAC). Across four years with the program, she tallied 34 points in 111 games.

She competed with the unified Korean national team in the women's ice hockey tournament at 2018 Winter Olympics. Brandt notched an assist on Randi Griffin’s goal against  in the preliminary round, one of two goals scored for Korea during the tournament.

After the 2018 Olympics, she was named an honorary ambassador to help promote post-adoption services and birth family searches by the South Korean Minister for Health & Welfare Park Neung-hoo.

She also competed with the South Korean team at the 2018 IIHF Women's World Championship Division I Group B tournament, where she led the team in total goals scored (5), including a 4 goal hat trick in the team's 9-2 win against Poland.

Personal life 

She is the adopted sister of Hannah Brandt, a centre who played with the United States women's national ice hockey team at the 2018 Winter Olympic Games and is currently affiliated with the Professional Women's Hockey Players Association (PWHPA).

In her youth, she was a figure skater before switching to hockey.

References

1992 births
Living people
American adoptees
American sportspeople of Korean descent
American women's ice hockey defensemen
Gustavus Adolphus College alumni
Ice hockey players from Minnesota
Ice hockey players at the 2018 Winter Olympics
South Korean adoptees
Olympic ice hockey players of South Korea
South Korean women's ice hockey defencemen
Winter Olympics competitors for Korea
Gustavus Adolphus Golden Gusties athletes